Tagkawayan station is a railway station located on the South Main Line in Tagkawayan, Quezon, Philippines. Serving the Tagkawayan municipal proper, it is still used for the Bicol Express and Isarog Limited.

History
Tagkawayan was opened on January 11, 1938 when the first freight service from Manila to Legazpi commenced, passenger services started on January 31.

Philippine National Railways stations
Railway stations in Quezon